= Sulaf Jalil =

Iraqi actress (born 1984)

Sulaf Jalil سولاف جليل
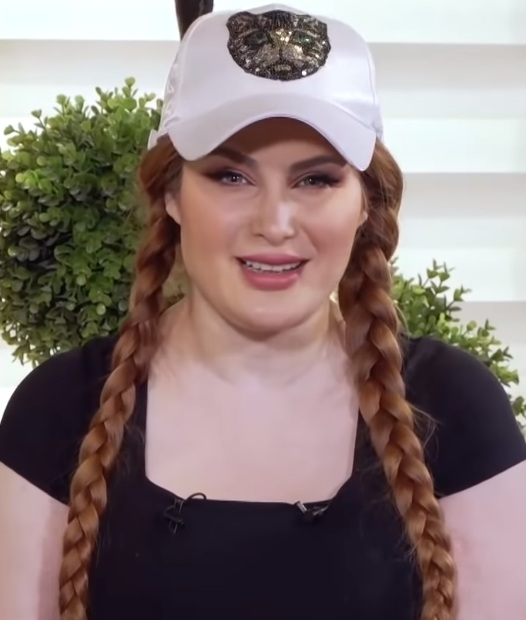
- Sulaf Jalil presents on alwalaa channel, 26 March 2021
- Born: January 17, 1984; Baghdad, Iraq
- Known for: actress and comedy artist and TV presenter
- Website: https://www.instagram.com/sollaf5/

Sulaf Jalil (Arabic: سولاف جليل; born January 17, 1984) is an Iraqi actress, comedy artist and TV presenter, born in Baghdad in 1984. She holds a BA in Languages Institute.

== Works ==
Jalil started her career at the age of ten, started in a children's TV series, and after that, she entered the drama and worked in the commercial theater and was her first play Shift baeny, directed by Imran Al-Tamimi and worked in the theater until 2003, after which she appeared in several satellite channels. She has worked numerous tv works, and her first TV work was on the series Abu Al-Alaa Al-Maari.

=== Series ===
- (Akher almlok)
- (Waker altheb)
- (Aldarsalawol)
- (Altity)
- (Zaraq Waraq)
- (3 Vies)
- Al-Qadud

=== Plays ===
- (Play Shift baeny)

=== Sound performance ===
- Dalaa LLatfal
